Epsy Alejandra Campbell Barr (born 4 July 1963 in San José, Costa Rica) is a Costa Rican politician and economist who served as the Vice-President of Costa Rica from 8 May 2018 to 8 May 2022. She is the first woman of African descent to be vice president in Costa Rica and in Latin America.

One of the founders of the Citizens' Action Party (PAC), she ran for president in 2010 and 2014, and was a deputy for San José Province in the Legislative Assembly from 2002 to 2006 and 2014 to 2018.

Early life and education
Epsy Campbell Barr was born in San José in 1963, while her parents Shirley Barr Aird and Luis Campbell Patterson were living in San Francisco de Dos Ríos. She is the fourth child of a family of five daughters and two sons. Other siblings include Sasha Campbell Barr, a singer, and Shirley Campbell Barr, a poet. Epsy Campbell is named after her paternal grandmother, who migrated from Jamaica to Costa Rica as a child. Her Afro-Costa Rican grandparents migrated to the country at the turn of the 20th century to build the country's first railroads. She married at a young age and became a mother when she was just starting her university studies. She has two daughters, Narda and Tanisha.

She attended primary school in Las Gravilias and Ricardo Jiménez Oreamuno School where she graduated in 1975, and completed her secondary education at Liceo Franco Costarricense and Colegio Superior de Señoritas. She studied flute and saxophone in the Youth Symphony Orchestra from 1976 to 1983.

Epsy Campbell began her university studies at the University of Costa Rica and later moved to the regional campus of Limón Province, where she studied and worked simultaneously. She lived on the Caribbean for ten years, then returned to San José, where she graduated as an economist from the Latin University of Costa Rica in 1998. She has an MA in Development Cooperation from the Foundation for Cultural and Social Sciences of Spain in 2008. She is a researcher and activist for the rights of women and people of African descent, and entered politics because she wanted to become a social activist.

She was president of the Citizens' Action Party (PAC) from February 2005 to February 2009. She was also a deputy for the PAC in the national legislature from 2002 to 2006, and the head of its parliamentary faction from 2003 to 2005. She was a vice-presidential candidate in 2006.

Organizations
Epsy Campbell has been the head of the Center for Women of African Descent, the Alliance of Leaders of African descent in Latin America and the Caribbean, and the Black Parliament of the Americas. She has participated in several conferences and meetings around the world, such as the Fourth World Conference on Women in Beijing, China, the III World Conference Against Racism in Durban, South Africa, the World Conference on the Environment, Eco 92, Rio de Janeiro, Brazil, and the First Encounter of Black Women of Latin America and the Caribbean, held in Santo Domingo, Dominican Republic. She was Coordinator of the Women's Forum for Central American Integration of the Network of Afro-Caribbean and Afro-Latin American Women and organizer of the Second Meeting of Afro-Caribbean and Afro-Latin American Women in San Jose, Costa Rica. Campbell is also member of the Washington D.C. based think tank The Inter-American Dialogue. She has written books and articles on topics such as democracy, inclusion, political and economic participation of women, people of African descent, sexism and racism, among others. She is an expert on issues of social development, equity, political participation of women and African descent.

2014 presidential bid
After serving in the legislature for four years (2002–2006) and running for vice president in 2006, Campbell decided to seek the nomination of the PAC. She traveled the country in an RV, taking her anti-corruption and accountability message to PAC voters. Three other candidates vied to represent PAC in the 2014 national elections: Juan Carlos Mendoza, Luis Guillermo Solís, and Ronald Solís Bolaños. As of February, 2013, she was the most popular opposition candidate; however, she bowed out of the race to Luis Guillermo Solís. Solís became Costa Rica's president elect in March 2014.

2014 deputy election
In March 2014, Campbell won a deputy position in San Jose, Costa Rica as a PAC candidate. When Solís became the de facto president elect, he mentioned that Campbell would be one of his choices for President of the Legislative Assembly, although Henry Mora Jiménez became the President of the Legislative Assembly in May 2014.

2018 presidential election
Campbell initially announced her intention to run in the PAC presidential primary for the 2018 presidential election, but withdrew from the race on 27 March 2017. However, she was subsequently selected by nominee Carlos Alvarado Quesada as one of two joint running mates, alongside Marvin Rodríguez. She condemned remarks by PIN candidate Juan Diego Castro alleging that female members of the Judiciary advanced in promotions due to sexual favors. Alvarado Quesada eventually advanced to the runoff and won, with Campbell becoming the first Afrodescendant vice-president of the country.

Awards 
 Recipient of 2021 Global Top 100 Most Influential People of African Descent (MIPAD - New York) - Politics & Governance (Class of 2021)

References

External links 
 
 Vamos o No Vamos Campaign Website (defunct)
 PAC Website
 

|-

|-

|-

1963 births
Living people
Citizens' Action Party (Costa Rica) politicians
Costa Rican economists
Costa Rican people of Jamaican descent
Female foreign ministers
Foreign ministers of Costa Rica
Members of the Legislative Assembly of Costa Rica
People from San José, Costa Rica
University of Costa Rica alumni
Vice presidents of Costa Rica
Women government ministers of Costa Rica
Women vice presidents
21st-century Costa Rican women politicians
21st-century Costa Rican politicians
Members of the Inter-American Dialogue
Latin University of Costa Rica alumni
Afro–Costa Rican